Masood Mufti (Urdu: مسعود مفتی‎; 10 June 1934 - 10 November 2020) was a Pakistani scholar of Urdu, short story writer, novelist, dramatist, columnist and civil servant.

Early life 
Masood Mufti was born in Gujrat, Pakistan on 10 June 1934.

He passed his matriculation exam in 1947 and earned his Master's degree in English literature from the Government College, Lahore.

In 1956, he obtained a diploma in public administration from St Catherine's College, the University of Cambridge, followed by a diploma in journalism in 1960.

Career 
Masood Mufti was a member of the Civil Service of Pakistan (CSP) from 1958 to 1994 and retired as Additional Secretary to the Government of Pakistan in grade BPS-21. He served as Secretary to the Government of East Pakistan, Education department at Dhaka. After the inception of Bangladesh, he was held by India as a Prisoner of War for almost two years. His witness to this national tragedy became the topic of his several books, including Lamhe (1978), his diary.

He was serving as Joint Secretary to the Government of Pakistan in the Economic Affairs Division (EAD) when General Zia-ul-Haq imposed martial law. In protest, he quit the federal government and went on deputation to serve in Asian Development Bank (ADB). He spoke against the feudal-army axis in Pakistan's democratic decay.  He went on to form the first public library in Loralai district where he served as district magistrate. He remained deputy commissioner of Larkana, commissioner of Lahore.

During his 1994-2009 retirement, he wrote articles in English and Urdu for the Pakistani press, as well as political and science books.

Literary works 
Masood Mufti published thirteen books. He wrote political, science, and history books. Mufti's works include:

Death 
Masood Mufti died on November 10, 2020 of cardiac arrest in Islamabad aged 86.

References 

 Trimscapes

Bibliography 
 

1934 births
2020 deaths